Ronnie Dove Sings the Hits for You is Ronnie Dove's fourth studio album (and fifth album release) for Diamond Records.

History

The album gathers Ronnie's latest singles "I Really Don't Want to Know", "Happy Summer Days", and "Let's Start All Over Again", all of which hit the charts in 1966.  Mountain of Love" would later appear as the B-side to a 1968 Ronnie Dove single "Never Gonna Cry".  However, "Mountain of Love" would be the side to chart.  It did not make the Top 40.  

The song “Happy Summer Days” was featured in a commercial for Amazon in 2019.

Release
The original album was released in both mono and stereo.  The album was reissued in the 90s, and was again reissued, from the original album masters, in 2020.

The album peaked at number 122 on the Billboard 200 chart.

Track listing

References

1966 albums
Ronnie Dove albums